Moldenke is a surname. Notable people with the surname include:

Charles Edward Moldenke (1860–1935), American Egyptologist
Edward Frederick Moldenke (1836–1904), Lutheran theologian and missionary of Germany and the U.S.
Harold Norman Moldenke (1909–1996), American botanist and taxonomist